Jeff & Sheri Easter are a Southern gospel group led by the husband and wife duo of the same name. Jeff also has 2 older children from a previous marriage.

Career

Jeff Easter and Sheri Williamson met in August 1984 during the Albert E. Brumley Sundown to Sunup Gospel Sing in Arkansas. At the time, Jeff was the bassist for the Singing Americans, while Sheri was performing with The Lewis Family. After being introduced, they married ten months later, June 1985. After that, Jeff and Sheri traveled and performed as part of The Lewis Family, until they decided to pursue a career alone in 1988. Since that, they have released several albums and have been nominated for various awards. Joining them on stage are their children: Madison (guitars) and Morgan (vocals). They have another daughter named Maura, who also occasionally joins them on stage in various roles. Madison's wife, Shannon Easter, and Morgan's husband, Landan Smith, are also members of the band. Jeff Easter is son of James Easter, known as member of The Easter Brothers (brothers Ed,
James and Russell, from Mount Airy, North Carolina), and brother of steel guitarist Steve "Rabbit" Easter.  Jeff & Sheri Easter have been frequent performers on the Gaither Homecoming videos and recordings.

Discography
 1987: New Tradition
 1988: Homefolks
 1989: Picture Perfect Love
 1990: Brand New Love
 1991: Shining Through
 1992: Pickin’ The Best Live
 1993: The Gift
 1994: Thread of Hope
 1995: By Request
 1995: Silent Witness
 1995: Ever Faithful To You (Love Songs: A 10 Year Celebration)
 1996: Places In Time
 1998: A Work In Progress
 1999: Sittin’ On Cloud Nine
 2000: Ordinary Day
 2000: Through The Years
 2001: It Feels Like Christmas Again
 2002: My Oh My
 2003: Forever And A Day
 2004: Sunshine
 2005: Miles And Milestones
 2007: Life Is Great and Gettin' Better!
 2008: Mayberry Live
 2009: We Are Family; with The Lewis Family and the Easter Brothers (won GMA Dove Award Bluegrass Album of the Year)
 2009: Expecting Good Things (nominated for GMA Dove Award Country Album of the Year)
 2010: Live at Oak Tree
 2011: Silver Anniversary
 2012: Eyes Wide Open
 2015: Small Town
 2017: Sing It Again
 2019: You Are Loved

Solo
 1997: Sheri

Accolades

Jeff & Sheri Easter have won several awards through their career. Among them:
 5 Dove Awards
 2 Grammy Award nominations
 2 International Country Gospel Music Association Awards

References

External links

Southern gospel performers
Family musical groups
Musicians from North Carolina